SIV or Siv may refer to:

Organizations
 Federal Executive Council (Yugoslavia) or Savezno izvršno veće (SIV)
 Sydney Intervarsity Choral Festival
 Sheffield International Venues, a facilities management company in Sheffield, UK
 Surinaamse Islamitische Vereniging, an Islamic association in Suriname

People
Siv (given name), a feminine given name

Places
 Siv, Iran, a village in Kurdistan Province, Iran
Siv Kladenets, a village Haskovo Province, Bulgaria

Science and technology
 S IV, a shortcut pronoun for the Samsung Galaxy S4 Android smartphone
 Stress migration (Stress-induced voiding), a failure mechanism in MOSFETs
 Key Wrap (Synthetic Initialization Vector), a cryptographic key-wrapping algorithm
 Simian immunodeficiency virus, a virus found in primates and related to HIV
 Swine influenza virus, the cause of influenza in pigs
 Silicon-vacancy center in diamond (Si-V), an optically active defect in diamond

Transport
 SIV, the IATA and FAA code for Sullivan County Airport, Sullivan County, Indiana, USA
 SIV, the National Rail code for St Ives railway station, Cornwall, UK

Other
 Special Immigrant Visa, a type of immigrant visa in the United States
 Structured investment vehicle, a type of fund in the non-bank financial system

See also
Steve